Nick Junior is an Indian children's pay television kids channel which is devoted to toddlers. The channel is the Indian equivalent to the original American network and a part of the Nickelodeon franchise.

History
The channel was a block on Nick India then Viacom18 launched it as a separate channel in fall of 2012.

Viacom18 launched TeenNick India and Nick Jr. as a single channel on 21 November 2012. At first, Nick Jr. aired in the daytime while TeenNick aired at night. However, TeenNick was discontinued on 1 February 2017, which made Nick Jr. a 24-hour channel.

Programming

References

India
Indian animation
Children's television channels in India
Television channels and stations established in 2012
English-language television stations in India
2012 establishments in India
Viacom 18